In condensed matter physics, Hofstadter's butterfly is a graph of the spectral properties of non-interacting two-dimensional electrons in a perpendicular magnetic field in a lattice. The fractal, self-similar nature of the spectrum was discovered in the 1976 Ph.D. work of Douglas Hofstadter and is one of the early examples of modern scientific data visualization. The name reflects the fact that, as Hofstadter wrote, "the large gaps [in the graph] form a very striking pattern somewhat resembling a butterfly."

The Hofstadter butterfly plays an important role in the theory of the integer quantum Hall effect and the theory of topological quantum numbers.

History 

The first mathematical description of electrons on a 2D lattice, acted on by a perpendicular homogeneous magnetic field, was studied by Rudolf Peierls and his student R. G. Harper in the 1950s.

Hofstadter first described the structure in 1976 in an article on the energy levels of Bloch electrons in perpendicular magnetic fields. It gives a graphical representation of the spectrum of Harper's equation at different frequencies. One key aspect of the mathematical structure of this spectrum – the splitting of energy bands for a specific value of the magnetic field, along a single dimension (energy) – had been previously mentioned in passing by Soviet physicist Mark Azbel in 1964 (in a paper cited by Hofstadter), but Hofstadter greatly expanded upon that work by plotting all values of the magnetic field against all energy values, creating the two-dimensional plot that first revealed the spectrum's uniquely recursive geometric properties.

Written while Hofstadter was at the University of Oregon, his paper was influential in directing further research. It predicted on theoretical grounds that the allowed energy level values of an electron in a two-dimensional square lattice, as a function of a magnetic field applied perpendicularly to the system, formed what is now known as a fractal set. That is, the distribution of energy levels for small scale changes in the applied magnetic field recursively repeat patterns seen in the large-scale structure. "Gplot", as Hofstadter called the figure, was described as a recursive structure in his 1976 article in Physical Review B, written before Benoit Mandelbrot's newly coined word "fractal" was introduced in an English text. Hofstadter also discusses the figure in his 1979 book Gödel, Escher, Bach. The structure became generally known as "Hofstadter's butterfly".

David J. Thouless and his team discovered that the butterfly's wings are characterized by Chern integers, which provide a way to calculate the Hall conductance in Hofstadter's model.

Confirmation 

In 1997 the Hofstadter butterfly was reproduced in experiments with microwave guide equipped by an array of scatterers. Similarity between the mathematical description of the microwave guide with scatterers and Bloch's waves in magnetic field allowed the reproduction of the Hofstadter butterfly for periodic sequences of the scatterers.

In 2001, Christian Albrecht, Klaus von Klitzing and coworkers realized an experimental setup to test Thouless et al.'s predictions about Hofstadter's butterfly with a two-dimensional electron gas in a superlattice potential.

In 2013, three separate groups of researchers independently reported evidence of the Hofstadter butterfly spectrum in graphene devices fabricated on hexagonal boron nitride substrates. In this instance the butterfly spectrum results from interplay between the applied magnetic field and the large scale moiré pattern that develops when the graphene lattice is oriented with near zero-angle mismatch to the boron nitride.

In September 2017, John Martinis’s group at Google, in collaboration with the Angelakis group at CQT Singapore, published results from a simulation of 2D electrons in a perpendicular magnetic field using interacting photons in 9 superconducting qubits. The simulation recovered Hofstadter's butterfly, as expected.

In 2021 the butterfly was observed in twisted bilayer graphene at the second magic angle.

Theoretical model

In his original paper, Hofstadter considers the following derivation: a charged quantum particle in a two-dimensional square lattice, with a lattice spacing , is described by a periodic Schrödinger equation, under a perpendicular static homogeneous magnetic field restricted to a single Bloch band. For a 2D square lattice, the tight binding energy dispersion relation is

,

For convenience we choose the gauge .

One can use  as an effective Hamiltonian to obtain the following time-independent Schrödinger equation:

Considering that the particle can only hop between points in the lattice, we write , where  are integers. Hofstadter makes the following ansatz: , where  depends on the energy, in order to obtain Harper's equation (also known as almost Mathieu operator for ):

The flux ratio  can also be expressed in terms of the magnetic length , such that .

Solutions to Harper's equation and Wannier treatment

Note that  is necessarily bounded between -4 and 4.

For large , the energy bands converge to thin energy bands corresponding to the Landau levels.

Gregory Wannier showed that by taking into account the density of states, one can obtain a Diophantine equation that describes the system, as

where

This equation characterizes all the solutions of Harper's equation.

The scale at which the butterfly can be resolved in a real experiment depends on the system's specific conditions.

Phase diagram, conductance and topology 

The phase diagram of electrons in a two-dimensional square lattice, as a function of a perpendicular magnetic field, chemical potential and temperature, has infinitely many phases. Thouless and coworkers showed that each phase is characterized by an integral Hall conductance, where all integer values are allowed. These integers are known as Chern numbers.

See also 
Aubry–André model

References

Fractals
Condensed matter physics
1976 introductions